Erstein is a commune in the Bas-Rhin department, in the region of Grand Est, France.

History

An important necropolis from the Merovingian era (6th-7th century) has been excavated near Erstein in 1999–2000.

Erstein was known in Alsace in the Middle Age for its canonesses monastery, founded in the 9th century and abandoned in 1422. The buildings were destroyed in the 16th and 19th centuries.

Demographics

Twin towns
 Endingen am Kaiserstuhl
 São João de Loure

People
 Laure Diebold, (1915–1965), Compagnon de la Libération, was born in Erstein
 François-Joseph d'Offenstein (1760–1837) French general, was born in Erstein

See also
 Communes of the Bas-Rhin department

References

Communes of Bas-Rhin
Bas-Rhin communes articles needing translation from French Wikipedia